Dr Ciarán Ó Coigligh is an Irish a poet and retired academic.

Born in Dublin in 1952, Ó Coigligh, studied at University College Dublin and Trinity College Dublin.  Ó Coigligh worked in the Modern Irish departments of NUI Galway and University College Dublin. He was a lecturer in Irish language, literature and civilisation in St. Patrick's College, Drumcondra.
In 1999, Ó Coigligh, as a lecturer in St. Patrick's College, Drumcondra, became a member of Dublin City University's Academic Council.

In 2015 he became president of Newman College Ireland, a post he no longer holds.

Unlike most Irish language campaigners, Ó Coigligh has spoken out against an Irish Language Act in Northern Ireland, and is vocal in his support for the Unionist DUP.

In June 2017, DCU suspended Ó Coigligh's email account and condemned as "offensive" an email he had sent to all of DCU's staff, about the death of fellow staff member Ann Louise Gilligan, the wife of Katherine Zappone, in which he described same-sex relationships as "a disorder" and stated that a sexual relationship between two women "cannot be conjugal, cannot be consummated, and cannot constitute marriage." The college stated:

Awards and prizes
 Arts Council Literary Bursary (1993)
 Travel and Training Award (2010) 
 Colm Cille Prize at the Strokestown International Poetry Competition (2011)

Publications
 'An Troigh ar an Tairne' by Ciarán Ó Coigligh
 'Cion' by Ciarán Ó Coigligh
 'The Heritage of John Paul II' by Ciarán Ó Coigligh
 'An Fhilíocht chomhaimseartha, 1975-1985' by Ciarán Ó Coigligh
 'Duibhlinn' by Ciarán Ó Coigligh
 'Filíocht Ghaeilge: Phádraig Mhic Phiarais' edited by Ciarán Ó Coigligh (Baile Átha Cliath: Clóchomhar, 1981)

References

1952 births
Living people
Irish poets
Alumni of University College Dublin
Alumni of Trinity College Dublin
People from County Dublin
Irish-language writers